The non-marine molluscs of the Gambier Islands are a part of the molluscan fauna of French Polynesia. There is a high degree of endemism of these species. The gastropod fauna has been affected by severe alterations to the natural environment of the Gambier Islands.  43 of the 46 species of snails that once made the Gambier Islands their homes are now extinct.

Land gastropods 
Assimineidae
 † Cyclomorpha secessa Bouchet & Abdou, 2003 - endemic
 † Omphalotropis margarita (Pfeiffer, 1851) - endemic

Euconulidae
 † Aukena endodonta Bouchet & Abdou, 2001 - endemic
 † Aukena tridentata (Baker, 1940) - endemic
 Philonesia mangarevae Baker, 1940 - endemic, at the base of Mont Mokoto

See also
 List of non-marine molluscs of the Pitcairn Islands
 List of non-marine molluscs of the Cook Islands

References

Molluscs
List
Gambier
Gambier Islands
Molluscs
Molluscs